Lobh (Gurmukhi: ਲੋਭ Lōbha) is a word derived from Sanskrit (लोभ), which translates in English to greed; it is a strong desire for worldly possessions and a constant focus on possessing material items, especially the urge to possess what rightfully belongs to others. According to Sikhism, it makes an individual selfish and self-centred. It takes a person away from his religious and social duties. A person can become blind with greed in an effort to control the desire for unlimited worldly possessions.

Sikhs do not believe that it is wrong to enjoy the good things in life, to be wealthy or to be admired by others. The Gurus taught that human beings should make the most of everything that God has given. However, if a person's actions and thoughts are focused on possessing the material things in life he or she is no longer focused on God then they are moving further and further from liberation and Mukti.

The following Shabads from Gurbani clarify this cardinal vice:

 Their intellect and understanding are perverted; they just don't understand. They are filled with greed and corruption. (Shri Guru Granth Sahib Ji Aang 27 line 1129)
 The world is deceived and plundered by riches, youth, greed and egotism. (Shri Guru Granth Sahib Ji Aang 61 line 2477)
 When you are under the power of sexual desire, anger and worldly attachment, or a greedy miser in love with your wealth; if you have committed the four great sins and other mistakes; even if you are a murderous fiend ..... if you then come to remember the Supreme Lord God, and contemplate Him, even for a moment, you shall be saved. ((4)) (Shri Guru Granth Sahib Ji Aang 70 line 2828)
 Within is the terrible darkness of greed, and so they come and go in reincarnation, over and over again. ((7)) (Shri Guru Granth Sahib Ji Aang 130 line 5300)
 Cruelty, material attachment, greed and anger are the four rivers of fire. Falling into them, one is burned, O Nanak! One is saved only by holding tight to good deeds. ((2)) (Shri Guru Granth Sahib Ji Aang 147 line 6072)
 You practice greed, avarice and great falsehood, and you carry such a heavy burden. O body, I have seen you blowing away like dust on the earth. ((1)) (Shri Guru Granth Sahib Ji Aang 154 line 6435)
 With greed within them, their minds are filthy, and they spread filth around. They do filthy deeds, and suffer in pain. (Shri Guru Granth Sahib Ji Aang 1062 line 45337)
 Kabeer, where there is spiritual wisdom, there is righteousness and Dharma. Where there is falsehood, there is sin. Where there is greed, there is death. Where there is forgiveness, there is God Himself. ((155)) (Shri Guru Granth Sahib Ji Aang 1372 line 58353)

Sikh terminology